Michela Carrara (born 5 October 1997) is an Italian biathlete.

Career results

World Championships

References

1997 births
Living people
Italian female biathletes
People from Aosta
Biathletes at the 2022 Winter Olympics
Olympic biathletes of Italy
Sportspeople from Aosta Valley